Kolos Stadium may refer to any of several stadiums in Ukraine:

 Kolos Stadium (Bershad), hosted a match in 2004–05 Ukrainian Cup in Bershad, Vinnytsia Oblast
 Kolos Stadium (Borispil), in Boryspil, Kyiv Oblast
 Kolos Stadium (Chkalove), hosted 2006 finals of Ukrainian Amateur Cup in Chkalove, Dnipropetrovsk Oblast
 Kolos Stadium (Khlibodarivka), hosted a round of 2016–17 Ukrainian Amateur Cup in Khlibodarivka, Kherson Oblast
 Kolos Stadium (Kovalivka), home of FC Kolos Kovalivka in Kovalivka, Kyiv Oblast
 Kolos Stadium (Luzhany), hosted 2000 finals of Ukrainian Amateur Cup in Luzhany, Chernivtsi Oblast
 Kolos Stadium (Lypovets), hosted a round of 2016–17 Ukrainian Amateur Cup in Lypovets, Vinnytsia Oblast
 Kolos Stadium (Mashivka), hosted 2012 finals of Ukrainian Amateur Cup in Mashivka, Poltava Oblast
 Kolos Stadium (Parkhomivka), hosted 1996–97 finals of Ukrainian Amateur Cup in Parkhomivka, Kharkiv Oblast
 Kolos Stadium (Sumy), former stadium for FC Spartak Sumy in Sumy, Sumy Oblast

Sports venues in Ukraine